Susanna Whipped Cream is a 1957 Italian-Spanish romantic comedy film directed by Steno.

Cast 

Marisa Allasio: Susanna
Germán Cobos: Alberto
Mario Carotenuto: Alfredo Libotti
Memmo Carotenuto: Scorcelletti the Younger
Nino Manfredi: Romoletto, the thief
Sandra Mondaini: Marisa Trombetti
Gianni Agus: Trombetti
Bice Valori: Rossella
Alberto Bonucci: Massimo
Gianrico Tedeschi: Gianluca
Raffaele Pisu: Arturo
Paolo Ferrari: Tao 
Gianni Bonagura: Milanesi 
Alberto Rabagliati: Commendatore Botta
Nuto Navarrini: Palpiti
Anna Campori:  Susanna's mother
Fernando Sancho: Aristide
Luz Márquez: Maria Dolores
Fanny Landini: Armida 
Francesco Mulé: Director
Giulio Calì: Scorcelletti the Older
Salvo Libassi: Roberto
Giacomo Furia: Taxi driver from Naples
Ignazio Leone: Taxi driver from Milan 
Loris Gizzi: Jeweler
Ángel Aranda
Ettore Manni

References

External links

1957 films
Italian romantic comedy films
1957 romantic comedy films
Films directed by Stefano Vanzina
1950s Italian films